Chinedu Ezimora (born 1 December 1985 in Oyigbo, Rivers State) is a Nigerian football (soccer) player currently with Heartland F.C. He is also a member of the Nigeria Beach Eagles.

Career
Ezimora began his career with Nasarawa United F.C. and played in the season 2008 one year on loan for Enyimba International F.C. After a year with Port Harcourt side Sharks F.C. he signed with Heartland F.C. in May 2011.

International career
He made his full senior debut on March 3, 2010, in the 5–2 win over Congo DR and scored one goal. A week later he played against Niger and in the home-based Super Eagle side that won the WAFU Cup, scoring against Benin

References 

1985 births
Living people
Nigerian footballers
Enyimba F.C. players
Association football midfielders
Nasarawa United F.C. players
Heartland F.C. players
Sportspeople from Rivers State
Nigeria international footballers